Distro Astro is a Linux based operating system targeted towards astronomers and astronomy enthusiasts. The project was started by Bamm Gabriana with contributions from other astronomy enthusiasts.

Features 

Distro Astro is based upon the MATE desktop, bearing resemblance to the user interface of Windows based operating systems. It is bundled with some mainstream desktop such as Mozilla Firefox and LibreOffice, as well as astronomy related software including Cartes du Ciel and KStars.

History 

The first version of Distro Astro was released on 1 January 2013. The OS had two minor updates in April and August, primarily addressing software upgrades and tweaks.

In November 2013, the OS had its first major upgrade as Distro Astro 2.0, nicknamed Pallas. It included new features such as dual-boot support and touch screen capability, as well as new software bundled.

Distro Astro 3.0 was released a year later in November 2014.

See also 
 Fedora Astronomy KDE

References

External links
 
 Facebook

Computer-related introductions in 2013